South Main Street Historic District is a national historic district located at Joplin, Jasper County, Missouri.   The district encompasses eight contributing buildings in a commercial section of Joplin.  It developed between about 1901 and 1960 and includes representative examples of Italianate and Colonial Revival style architecture. Notable buildings include the Phillips Building (c. 1901), Miles Block (c. 1900), Bennett Building (c. 1909), and William E. Sanders Building (1909).

It was listed on the National Register of Historic Places in 2010.

References

Historic districts on the National Register of Historic Places in Missouri
Italianate architecture in Missouri
Colonial Revival architecture in Missouri
Buildings and structures in Joplin, Missouri
National Register of Historic Places in Jasper County, Missouri